At least two ships of the Hellenic Navy have borne the name Rodos, after the Greek island of Rhodes:

 Greek landing ship Rodos (L157), an  launched in 1942 as USS LST-391 and renamed USS Bowman County in 1955. She was transferred to Greece in 1960 and renamed Rodos. She was stricken in 1997.
 . a  commissioned in 2000.

Hellenic Navy ship names